Devontae Shuler (born February 9, 1998) is an American professional basketball player for the Cleveland Charge of the NBA G League. He played college basketball for the Ole Miss Rebels.

High school career
As a sophomore, Shuler averaged 25.5 points per game for Irmo High School in Columbia, South Carolina and led his team to the Class 4A lower state title game. He played alongside Zion Williamson and Ja Morant with the South Carolina Hornets Amateur Athletic Union program. After the season, he transferred to Oak Hill Academy in Mouth of Wilson, Virginia. Shuler helped his team win the High School National title as a junior. In his senior season, Shuler averaged 15.3 points, 4.3 rebounds, 4.1 assists and 3.7 steals per game. A four-star recruit, he committed to playing college basketball for Ole Miss over offers from South Carolina, Oklahoma State and Miami (Florida).

College career
As a freshman at Ole Miss, Shuler averaged six points, 2.7 rebounds and 1.1 assists per game, primarily playing off the ball alongside Breein Tyree. He decided to return to the team despite a coaching change after the season, after meeting with new coach Kermit Davis. Shuler moved into a starting role and averaged 10.3 points, 4.1 rebounds and three assists per game as a sophomore. He recorded 56 steals, the most ever by an Ole Miss sophomore and the seventh-most in program history. Shuler declared for the 2019 NBA draft before returning to college. On February 1, 2020, he scored a junior season-high 28 points along with five three-pointers in a 73–63 loss to LSU. As a junior, Shuler averaged 11.7 points, 4.5 rebounds and 3.3 assists per game. He averaged 15.3 points and 3.3 assists per game as a senior, earning First Team All-SEC honors.

Professional career

Capital City Go-Go (2021–2022)
After going undrafted in the 2021 NBA draft, Shuler joined the Dallas Mavericks for 2021 NBA Summer League. On October 15, 2021, he signed with the Washington Wizards. Shuler was waived on October 16.  In October 2021, he joined the Capital City Go-Go as an affiliate player. On December 29, 2022, Shuler was waived.

Fort Wayne Mad Ants (2023)
On January 15, 2023, Shuler was acquired by the Fort Wayne Mad Ants. He was waived on February 8.

Cleveland Charge (2023–present)
On February 13, 2023, Shuler was acquired by the Cleveland Charge.

Career statistics

College

|-
| style="text-align:left;"| 2017–18
| style="text-align:left;"| Ole Miss
| 32 || 9 || 18.8 || .352 || .259 || .750 || 2.7 || 1.1 || 1.0 || .1 || 6.0
|-
| style="text-align:left;"| 2018–19
| style="text-align:left;"| Ole Miss
| 33 || 31 || 32.2 || .458 || .402 || .823 || 4.2 || 3.0 || 1.7 || .2 || 10.3
|-
| style="text-align:left;"| 2019–20
| style="text-align:left;"| Ole Miss
| 32 || 32 || 33.1 || .423 || .355 || .626 || 4.5 || 3.3 || 1.7 || .3 || 11.7
|-
| style="text-align:left;"| 2020–21
| style="text-align:left;"| Ole Miss
| 27 || 27 || 32.8 || .409 || .340 || .766 || 3.0 || 3.3 || 1.6 || .1 || 15.3
|- class="sortbottom"
| style="text-align:center;" colspan="2"| Career
| 124 || 99 || 29.1 || .413 || .340 || .725 || 3.6 || 2.7 || 1.5 || .2 || 10.6

Personal life
Shuler is the son of Donald and Linda Shuler, and his father works in the state government. Shuler was diagnosed with vitiligo, a skin condition causing a loss of pigment, in his early high school years. He has five brothers and two sisters, including Dontrell, who plays college basketball for Middle Tennessee State, and Dominic, who plays professional basketball. Another brother, Deandre, died in 2000 at the age of three.

References

External links
Ole Miss Rebels bio

1998 births
Living people
American men's basketball players
Basketball players from South Carolina
Capital City Go-Go players
Fort Wayne Mad Ants players
Shooting guards
Ole Miss Rebels men's basketball players
People with vitiligo